Dennis McComak (born January 2, 1952) is an American archer. He competed in the men's individual event at the 1972 Summer Olympics.

References

1952 births
Living people
American male archers
Olympic archers of the United States
Archers at the 1972 Summer Olympics
People from Columbus, Kansas